Yuzhou is a county-level city in the central part of Henan, People's Republic of China. It occupies the northwest corner of the prefecture-level city of Xuchang. The city is named for Yu the Great, the founder of the Xia Dynasty, which the city's government claims was founded in present-day Yuzhou, and that the dynasty's capital was located in present-day Yuzhou. There is a statue of Yu the Great in Yuzhou, and he serves as a symbol of the city.

Jun ware comprises one of the Five Great Kilns, a group of highly esteemed porcelain types from the Song dynasty. Yuzhou has historically served as a major center of traditional Chinese medicine, and the city's historic medicinal tradition has been recognized by the national government. Famous Chinese doctor Sun Simiao had been a doctor in Yuzhou for a long period of time during the Tang dynasty.

Nicknames for the city include "Summer Capital", "Jun Capital", and "Medicine Capital". Yuzhou was named the first historical and cultural city in Henan Province in 1989.

History 
The Wadian archeological site, part of a network of sites belonging to the Late Neolithic Longshan culture, is located in Yuzhou.

Yuzhou was changed from a county to a county-level city in 1988.

At the beginning of January 2022, it was forced into a Covid-19 lockdown after three asymptomatic cases of Covid-19 variants were discovered.

Geography 

23.24% of Yuzhou's area is forested.

Climate

Administrative divisions
Yuzhou is directly divided into 5 subdistricts, 19 towns, 1 township, and 1 ethnic township. These 26 township-level divisions then further administer 678 village-level divisions.

Subdistricts

Towns

Townships 

 

Ethnic townships 


Demographics 

As of 2020, the per capita disposable income of Yuzhou's urban residents reached 35,330 renminbi (RMB), a 1.6% increase from 2019. This figure stood at 20,442 RMB for the city's rural residents, a 6.3% increase from 2019. 52% of Yuzhou's residents live in urban areas.

95% of Yuzhou's population is connected to the city's water grid, 90% of the population has a gas connection, and 58% receive municipal heating.

Economy 
As of 2020, Yuzhou's gross domestic product (GDP) totaled 84.96 billion renminbi (RMB), a 3.1% increase from 2019.

Yuzhou is located in the Central Plains Economic Zone, an economic region of central Henan province, and borders the Zhengzhou Airport Economy Zone.

Agriculture 
Crops used in traditional Chinese medicine are grown in large quantities in Yuzhou, and a 2021 government publication estimates that about 400,000 mu of cropland are used to grow plants for use in traditional Chinese medicine. The same report estimated that 170,000 mu of cropland in Yuzhou is used to grow sweet potatoes. Grains are also grown in large quantities throughout the city, and a large number of pigs are raised Yuzhou.

Natural resources 
The area of Yuzhou is home to significant deposits of coal, limestone, bauxite, and clay.

Electricity generation 
The city is home to thermal power plants with a capacity of 2.02 million kilowatts.

Transportation

Rail 

The Beijing–Guangzhou railway passes through east of Yuzhou. The Yuzhou–Dengfeng railway runs through the western portion of Yuzhou, connecting the city to nearby Dengfeng. The  begins in the city, linking it to the prefecture-level city of Bozhou in northwestern Anhui province.

Major roads 

 passes through east of Yuzhou.

References 

Cities in Henan
County-level divisions of Henan
Xuchang
Late Neolithic